The Men's +100 kg event at the 2010 South American Games was held on March 19.

Medalists

Results

Round Robin

Points system:

Contests

References
Report

M101
South American Games 2010